Jane Boit Patten (8 June 1869 – 6 December 1964) was an American botanist.  Patten collected plants in Switzerland, Italy, Hungary and Greece from 1899 to 1900. Her herbarium was given to the Gray Herbarium in 1938.

Written works
 Spring Flora of the Kavoúsi Region in Gournia, Vasiliki and other prehistoric cities on the Isthmus of Hierapetra, Crete ; excavations of the Wells-Houston-Cramp expeditions 1901, 1903, 1904, the American exploration Society, Free Museum of science and art, 1908
 Jane Boit Patten, Percy G. Stiles: On the influence of neutral salts upon the rate of salivary digestion. in American Journal of Physiology, Vol. XVII, No. 1, 1. September 1906, S. 26 (online)

References

1869 births
1964 deaths
American women scientists
19th-century American botanists
20th-century American botanists
19th-century American women
20th-century American women scientists